Ardèche Classic (also known as the Souvenir Francis Delpech) is a road bicycle race held annually in late-February in the Ardèche department of France. The race was a National Event from its inception in 2001 until 2007, before joining the UCI Europe Tour in 2008 as a 1.2 category race and becoming a professional 1.1 race in 2010.

Until 2013, the race was known as Les Boucles du Sud-Ardèche, before a secondary race was added by the Ruoms Cyclisme Organisation – La Drôme Classic – to be held on the same weekend as the Classic Sud-Ardèche.

Winners

References

External links

Results from CyclingArchives.com

 
UCI Europe Tour races
Cycle races in France
Recurring sporting events established in 2001
2001 establishments in France